Milky seas, also called mareel, is a luminous phenomenon in the ocean in which large areas of seawater (up to ) appear to glow translucently (in varying shades of blue). Such occurrences glow brightly enough at night to be visible from satellites orbiting Earth.

Mariners and other seafarers have reported that the ocean often emits a visible glow which extends for miles at night. In 2005, scientists announced that for the first time, they had obtained photographic evidence of this glow. It is most likely caused by bioluminescence.

Effect

Between 1915 and 1993, 235 sightings of milky seas were documented, most of which are concentrated in the northwestern Indian Ocean and near Indonesia. The luminescent glow is concentrated on the surface of the ocean and does not mix evenly throughout the water column.

In 1985, a research vessel in the Arabian Sea took water samples during milky seas. Their conclusions were that the effect was caused by the bacterium Vibrio harveyi. Mareel is typically caused by Noctiluca scintillans (popularly known as "sea sparkle"), a dinoflagellate that glows when disturbed and is found in oceans throughout much of the world.
In July 2015, at Alleppey, Kerala, India, the phenomenon occurred and the National Institute of Oceanography and Kerala Fisheries Department researched it, finding that the glittering waves were the result of Noctiluca scintillans.
In 2005, Steven Miller of the Naval Research Laboratory in Monterey, California, was able to match 1995 satellite images with a first-hand account of a merchant ship. The luminescent field was observed to glow over three consecutive nights.

While monochromatic photos make this effect appear white, Monterey Bay Aquarium Research Institute scientist Steven Haddock (an author of a milky seas effect study) has commented, "the light produced by the bacteria is actually blue, not white. It is white in the graphic because of the monochromatic sensor we used, and it can appear white to the eye because the rods in our eye (used for night vision) don't discriminate color." In Shetland (where generally caused by Noctiluca scintillans), mareel has sometimes been described as being green, rather than the traditional blue or white milky seas effect seen by the rest of the world. It is not known whether this difference depends on the area, or simply a perception of a cyanic colour as being green.

Etymology
The phenomenon is known as mareel in Shetland. This term is derived from the Norn word *mareld, which is itself derived from the Old Norse word mǫrueldr, which is a compound of marr (mere, sea) and eldr (fire).

Notes

References

Further reading 
 Detailed discussion and images of milky sea observation
 BBC News: 'Milky seas' detected from space
 Miller, S.D., S.H.D. Haddock, C.D. Elvidge, T.F. Lee. Detection of a bioluminescent milky sea from space. Proceedings of the National Academy of Sciences. v102:14181-14184 Abstract
 Nealson, K.H. and J.W. Hastings (2006) Quorum sensing on a global scale: massive numbers of bioluminescent bacteria make milky seas Appl. Environ. Microbiol. 72:2295-2297. Manuscript
 Nijhuis, Michelle (2022) "The Mystery of Milky Seas", Scientific American, 327(2): 30–39.

Bioluminescence
Biological oceanography
Aquatic ecology